The Philadelphia Wings were one of the original four franchises in the Eagle Pro Box Lacrosse League, joining the New Jersey Saints, Washington Wave, and Baltimore Thunder in 1987. While the Wings went only 3-4 that first season including a loss in the playoffs, they drew an average of almost 12,000 fans to their three 1987 regular season games.

Some of the early stars of those teams included Mike French, Hall of Fame college player at Cornell and a current team executive, as well as John Grant Sr., father of current NLL star John Grant Jr.

Results

Game log
Reference:

(p) - denotes playoff game

1987 Highlights
 Wings drew 43,887 fans at home at the Spectrum for an average of 10,972 per game.
 Hall of Famer Mike French led the league in scoring with 14 goals, 9 assists for 23 points in 6 games.
 Original Philadelphia Wings player John Grant Sr. contributed 4 goals, 10 assists for 14 points in 8 games.

Roster
Reference:

See also
 Philadelphia Wings
 1987 Eagle Pro Box Lacrosse League season

References

External links
https://web.archive.org/web/20071102134725/http://www.wingszone.com/whistory/history.htm

Philadelphia Wings seasons
Philadelphia Wings
1987 in lacrosse